Eulabini is a tribe of darkling beetles in the family Tenebrionidae. There are at least three genera in Eulabini, found in North America.

Genera
These genera belong to the tribe Eulabini:
 Apsena Leconte, 1862
 Epantius LeConte, 1851
 Eulabis Eschscholtz, 1829

References

Further reading

 
 

Tenebrioninae